The Washington and Old Dominion Railroad (colloquially referred to as the W&OD) was an intrastate short-line railroad located in Northern Virginia, United States. The railroad was a successor to the bankrupt Washington and Old Dominion Railway and to several earlier railroads, the first of which began operating in 1859. The railroad closed in 1968.

The Railroad's oldest line extended from Alexandria on the Potomac River northwest to Bluemont at the base of the Blue Ridge Mountains near Snickers Gap, not far from the boundary line between Virginia and West Virginia. The railroad's route largely paralleled the routes of the Potomac River and the present Virginia State Route 7.  The single-tracked line followed the winding course of Four Mile Run upstream from Alexandria through Arlington to Falls Church. At that point, the railroad was above the Fall Line and was able to follow a more direct northwesterly course in Virginia through Dunn Loring, Vienna, Sunset Hills (now in Reston), Herndon, Sterling, Ashburn and Leesburg.  The line turned sharply to the west after passing through Clarke's Gap in Catoctin Mountain west of Leesburg. Its tracks then continued westward through Paeonian Springs, Hamilton, Purcellville and Round Hill to reach its terminus at Bluemont.  A branch connected the line to Rosslyn. 

After the closure of the railroad, the track was removed.  The Washington and Old Dominion Railroad Trail (W&OD Trail), the Bluemont Junction Trail, the Mount Jefferson Park and Greenway Trail, several other trails, Interstate 66 (I-66), and Old Dominion Drive (VA Route 309) have replaced much of the railroad's route.

History

Predecessors of the W&OD (1855–1911)

Originally incorporated as the Alexandria and Harper's Ferry Railroad, construction on the line began in 1855 by the Alexandria, Loudoun and Hampshire (AL&H) Railroad under the presidency of Lewis McKenzie. Initially intended to cross the Blue Ridge Mountains and the Shenandoah River to reach the coal fields in the western part of Hampshire County, Virginia, that are now within Mineral County, West Virginia, the AL&H began operating to Vienna in 1859 from a terminal near Princess and Fairfax Streets in Alexandria's present Old Town neighborhod.

In 1860, the AL&H reached Leesburg in Loudoun County, with plans to extend the line westward through Hillsborough, Vestal's Gap, Berryville, Winchester and Romney. The line would terminate in Paddy Town (now Keyser, West Virginia), where it would make connections with the Baltimore and Ohio Railroad. Construction may have proceeded pursuant to those plans, as an 1864 Confederate army map shows that the railroad's tracks had passed Leesburg, crossed Catoctin Mountain at Clarke's Gap and passed Hillsborough.

Because of its proximity to Washington, D.C., the line saw much use and disruption during the Civil War. After the war, the name of the line was changed in 1870 to the Washington and Ohio Railroad. After changing its planned route to enable it to cross the Blue Ridge through Snickers Gap rather than the more northerly Vestal's Gap, the railroad extended its line from Leesburg to Hamilton in 1870 and to Round Hill in 1874.

Upon acquisition by new owners in the 1880s, the line's name was changed twice: first to the Washington and Western Railroad in 1882 and in the next year to the Washington, Ohio and Western (WO&W) Railroad. However, the line did not serve Washington, Ohio, or the West.

In 1886, the Richmond and Danville Railroad, whose trunk line travelled between Washington, D.C., and Atlanta with connections to New York City, New Orleans, Mississippi and Florida, leased the WO&W. The Richmond and Danville also acquired a branch that paralleled the WO&W while traveling between Manassas and Strasburg, Virginia, where it connected to railroads in the Shenandoah Valley west of the Blue Ridge that the WO&W did not reach (see: Manassas Gap Railroad). In 1888, the Richmond and Danville began to operate the WO&W's trains between Washington, D.C., and Round Hill.

In 1894, the newly formed Southern Railway absorbed the Richmond and Danville Railroad and acquired the WO&W. In 1900, the Southern Railway extended the line westward for four miles from Round Hill to Bluemont (formerly Snickersville). The Southern Railway designated the line as its Bluemont Branch.

By 1908, steam locomotives were hauling Southern Railway passenger trains from the new Union Station in Washington, D.C., to Alexandria Junction (north of old town Alexandria), where they switched to travel westward on the Bluemont Branch. Connecting trains shuttled passengers between Alexandria Junction and the former AL&H terminal in old town Alexandria. On weekends, express trains carried vacationers from Washington to Bluemont and other towns in western Loudoun County in which resorts had developed.

Meanwhile, in 1906, electric trolleys began to run on the Great Falls and Old Dominion Railroad (GF&OD) northwest to Great Falls from Georgetown in Washington, D.C. The line, which John Roll McLean and Stephen Benton Elkins owned at the time, crossed the Potomac River on the old Aqueduct Bridge and passed through Rosslyn. The trolleys then traveled northwest on a double-tracked line through Arlington and Fairfax County to reach an amusement park (trolley park) that the railroad company constructed and operated near the falls.

Maps

Washington and Old Dominion Railway (1911–1936)

In 1911, McLean and Elkins formed a new corporation, the Washington and Old Dominion Railway. In that year, they concluded negotiations with the Southern Railway to lease the Southern's Bluemont Branch and to take over all service on the branch on July 1, 1912. The lease excluded the portion of the Southern's route that connected Potomac Yard with the former AL&H terminal in old town Alexandria.

In 1912, the GF&OD became the "Great Falls Division" of the W&OD Railway, while the Southern's Bluemont Branch became a part of the W&OD Railway's "Bluemont Division". The W&OD electrified all of its operations over the next four years, becoming an  interurban electric trolley system that carried passengers, mail, milk and freight.

From that time onward, W&OD trains crossed over Potomac Yard on a long trestle constructed earlier for the Southern Railway. In contrast to the Southern Railway's earlier Bluemont Branch service, the W&OD Railway's Bluemont Division did not serve Washington's Union Station.

To join its two lines, the W&OD Railway constructed in 1912 a double-tracked Bluemont Division connecting line that traveled between two new junctions in Arlington: Bluemont Junction on the Alexandria-Bluemont line and Thrifton Junction on the Georgetown-Great Falls line. The connecting line passed through Lacey (near the west end of Ballston), crossing on a through girder bridge over a competing interurban electric trolley line, the Fairfax line of the Washington-Virginia Railway (see Northern Virginia trolleys). The rival line carried passengers between Rosslyn, Clarendon, Ballston, Falls Church, Vienna and Fairfax City.

The railway's electrification system distributed 650 volts direct current (DC) to its Bluemont Division cars and trains through overhead catenary lines. Single overhead lines carried the Great Falls Division's electricity over its tracks. Stationary and movable electrical substations containing Westinghouse alternating current (AC) to DC converters were located at various points along the railway's routes.

The W&OD's main passenger line ran from Georgetown and Rosslyn through Thrifton Junction, Bluemont Junction and westward to Bluemont. However, after crossing the Potomac River from Georgetown, many W&OD passengers transferred in Rosslyn to the trolleys of the competing Washington-Virginia Railway. Most of the W&OD's freight trains ran between Potomac Yard, Bluemont Junction and either Rosslyn or various locations along the Bluemont Division.

In 1923, the W&OD Railway ceased operating from Georgetown when the federal government replaced the aging Aqueduct Bridge with the new Francis Scott Key Bridge. At the same time, the railroad constructed a new passenger station in Rosslyn which became its "Washington" terminal.

The W&OD Railway fell upon hard times in the 1930s during the Great Depression. In 1932, the railway went into bankruptcy and was placed in receivership. The railway also discontinued passenger service between Bluemont Junction and Alexandria during 1932.

In 1934, the railway abandoned operations on the Great Falls Division between Thrifton Junction and Great Falls. The abandoned railway route then became Old Dominion Drive (Virginia State Route 309). In 1979, the old rail trestle of the Great Falls Division over Difficult Run was demolished after years of carrying automobile traffic on Old Dominion Drive.

Washington and Old Dominion Railroad (1936–1965)

In 1936, the Washington and Old Dominion Railroad, a new corporation that Davis Elkins (the son of Stephen Benton Elkins) had created, assumed operation of the remnants of the W&OD Railway, which consisted only of the Railway's Bluemont Division and the portion of the former Great Falls Division that had remained between Rosslyn and Thrifton (which was no longer a junction). Shortly thereafter, in 1939, the railroad abandoned the western end of its line, which had connected the towns of Purcellville and Bluemont. In the same year, the signature station in Rosslyn was torn down to make way for a better entrance to the Key Bridge.

In 1945, the W&OD Railroad acquired ownership of the section of line between Potomac Yard and Purcellville that the W&OD Railway had earlier leased from the Southern Railway. The Southern Railway retained ownership of the easternmost section of the railroad's route, which still connected Potomac Yard to the Southern's freight and passenger stations in old town Alexandria.

During the 1940s, the W&OD Railroad converted all of its lines' operations from electric to diesel or gasoline power. The railroad discontinued its electrified passenger service in 1941, but temporarily resumed passenger service during World War II using gas–electric motor cars and cars pulled by diesel–electric locomotives. Passenger and mail service finally ended in 1951; thereafter, the railroad carried only freight. The Chesapeake and Ohio Railway (C&O) purchased the W&OD Railroad in 1956, but did not change the railroad's name.

The 1960s were a decade of decline and closure for the W&OD. The Virginia highway department began negotiations to purchase the Rosslyn spur in 1960 and was trying to buy the mainline as early as 1962 for the construction of a road that was to become Interstate 66 (I-66). In July 1962, the highway department bought the Rosslyn spur for $900,000. In September 1963, the railroad stopped operating to Rosslyn. The railroad removed its tracks between Lacey (south of Washington Boulevard) and Rosslyn by November 1964.

Abandonment (1965—1968)
In February 1965, the Commonwealth of Virginia contracted to buy  of the mainline from Herndon to Alexandria for $3.5 million. The C&O Railway then petitioned the Interstate Commerce Commission (ICC) for permission to abandon the railroad's remnant. The purchase would eliminate the need to build a grade separation where the railroad crossed the Henry G. Shirley Memorial Highway (now part of Interstate 395 (I-395)) at grade and at another grade separation for I-66. The purchase would also provide  of right-of-way for I-66, saving the state $5 million.

Business interests in Loudoun County, the Arlington County Chamber of Commerce, various state, county and local officials, railway labor organizations and 21 of the 133 shippers who still used the railroad's freight service opposed the purchase. The Northern Virginia Transportation Commission (NVCC), which was interested in converting the line to a commuter rail service, also opposed the purchase. The Washington Metropolitan Area Transit Authority (WMATA), which at the time was planning to construct a rapid transit system for the Washington area, tried to postpone the abandonment in the hopes of using part of the right-of-way for transit.

The highway department simultaneously made plans to secretly sell all but  of the route to the Virginia Electric and Power Company (VEPCO) (now Dominion Virginia Power), whose transmission lines were running along the railroad's right-of-way. The sale would thus prevent the NVCC from buying the land for mass transit.

In August 1967, transit advocates led by Del. Clive L. DuVal II (Fairfax-Falls Church) and WMATA secured a 60-day postponement of the abandonment while they put together a plan to use the right-of-way for transit. However, according to WMATA general manager Jackson Graham, the estimated cost of using the full right-of-way for commuter rail was $70 million. Because WMATA did not expect the proposed transit line to be able to generate enough ridership to be cost-effective, WMATA rejected that option.

On November 10, 1967, WMATA announced that it had come to an agreement with the highway department that would give WMATA a two–year option to buy a  stretch of the right of way from Glebe Road (Virginia Route 120) to the Capital Beltway (now Interstate 495 (I-495)), where I-66 was to be built. WMATA would operate mass transit in the highway's median strip. A last minute offer to buy the railroad at its salvage cost and keep it running that the railroad's customers made was rejected in 1967.

In 1968, the ICC decided to permit the C&O to abandon and sell its line. After initially planning to run their last train on January 30, 1968, a temporary restraining order kept the line open until August 27, 1968. On the last day, B&O switcher 9155 pulled two empty lumber cars to Potomac Yard from the Murphy and Ames Lumber Company siding in Falls Church. On August 30, the railroad shipped its three diesel locomotives to the B&O's Baltimore engine terminal, from which a salvage dealer purchased them. By 1969, the C&O had removed all of its tracks and ties, except for some tracks that were crossing paved roads. In 1974, the railroad's bridge over the Capital Beltway was demolished to enable the highway to be widened.

Legacy
The Virginia highway department retained the section of the railroad's route that crossed the Henry G. Shirley Memorial Highway along the Arlington-Alexandria boundary and the portion of the route in Arlington immediately east of Falls Church, on which it built I–66. WMATA then constructed a part of Washington Metro's Orange Line within the median strip of I-66 on that portion of the railroad's former route.

In 1977, VEPCO agreed to sell to the Northern Virginia Regional Park Authority (NVRPA) (now NOVA Parks) for $3.6 million the portion of its right-of-way that lay west of the Alexandria/Arlington boundary. The NVRPA then incorporated that portion of the right-of-way into its Washington and Old Dominion Railroad Regional Park, within which it constructed the W&OD Trail. NVRPA completed the trail to Purcellville in 1988.

In 1999, Virginia Department of Historic Resources staff determined that the "Washington and Old Dominion Railroad Historic District" was eligible for listing on the National Register of Historic Places (NRHP).  A 2000 NRHP registration form states that the Historic District is eligible for the listing because the District "is associated with events that have made a significant contribution to the broad patterns of our history". The form contains an in-depth description of the District's historical resources and of the railroad's history, as well as maps that show the locations of the Districts's major historical features.

On June 18, 1979, the Heritage Conservation and Recreation Service of the United States Department of the Interior added the Herndon depot to the NRHP. On May 28, 2010, the National Park Service added the Purcellville train station to the NRHP. The Virginia Department of Historic Resources has added both stations to the Virginia Landmarks Register.

Bluemont Division, Alexandria-Bluemont line 

Most of the Bluemont Division's passenger cars or trains ran on the W&OD Railway's Great Falls Division's line from Georgetown over the Aqueduct Bridge through Rosslyn to Thrifton Junction. From Thrifton Junction, the trains ran on the Bluemont Division's connecting line to Bluemont Junction, where they met other Bluemont Division passenger cars or trains that ran from Alexandria, following Four Mile Run in Arlington. Some of the Bluemont Division cars or trains then continued their trips through Falls Church, Vienna, Herndon, Sterling, Ashburn, Leesburg, Clarke's Gap and Purcellville to terminate in Bluemont, Virginia, at the base of the Blue Ridge Mountains, following a route that was similar to that of Virginia State Route 7.

After the W&OD Railroad closed, the Southern Railway and its successor, the Norfolk Southern Railway, operated a spur between the Alexandria waterfront and a north-south route that traveled through Potomac Yard before the Yard closed in 1989. The spur formerly served trains traveling from the eastern end of the Bluemont Division to the Southern Railway's freight and passenger stations in old town Alexandria. As the Southern Railway owned and operated the spur and the stations, this section of track remained in operation after the W&OD closed. Railroad operations ended on the spur in 2012–2013 when GenOn Energy's Potomac River Generating Station and the Robinson Terminal's Oronoco Street warehouse closed.

A paved trail in Alexandria's linear Mt. Jefferson Park has replaced part of the Bluemont Division's course through that city. NOVA Parks' -long W&OD Trail travels in the Washington and Old Dominion Railroad Regional Park within the Bluemont Division's former right-of-way from the Alexandria/Arlington boundary through Bluemont Junction to Purcellville. The section of the Bluemont Division between Purcellville and Bluemont has not become a part of any trail, as the W&OD Railroad abandoned this section in 1938, thirty years before the remainder of its line closed.

Great Falls Division 

In 1906, the 15-mile electrified Great Falls and Old Dominion Railroad (GF&OD) began operating from Georgetown in Washington, D.C. to the present site of Great Falls Park in Virginia. From Georgetown, the railroad crossed the Potomac River on the old Aqueduct Bridge to Rosslyn in Arlington. From Rosslyn, the railroad traveled northwest along the later routes of Lee Highway (U.S. Route 29) and Old Dominion Drive (Virginia State Route 309) until it reached Great Falls. In 1912, the GF&OD became the Great Falls Division of the W&OD, sharing trackage with the W&OD's Bluemont Division between Rosslyn and Thrifton Junction.

Thrifton-Bluemont Junction connecting line

The Thrifton-Bluemont Junction connecting line, a component of the W&OD's Bluemont Division, opened in 1912. The line connected the W&OD's Great Falls Division (formerly the Great Falls and Old Dominion Railroad) with the Bluemont Division's Alexandria-Bluemont line.

The line closed in sections in 1963 and 1968. I–66 and the adjacent Custis Trail replaced the line between Thrifton and Washington Boulevard in Ballston. Arlington County's Bluemont Junction Trail replaced the line between Washington Boulevard and Bluemont Junction.

Bluemont Junction, where the Bluemont Junction Trail now meets the W&OD Trail, presently contains an Arlington County railroad display that features a Southern Railway bay window caboose. The caboose was built in 1971, three years after the W&OD Railroad closed.

Surviving Locomotives 
At least four locomotives that the W&OD had owned or leased still survived in 2017.
B&O 8413, a General Motors' (GM) Electro-Motive Corporation (later part of GM's Electro-Motive Division (EMD)) SW1 diesel–electric switcher locomotive assembled in 1940 with construction number 1111, was one of the first SW1s that Electro-Motive built. After acquisition, the Baltimore and Ohio Railroad (B&O) initially numbered the locomotive as 213, but subsequently changed the number to 8413. Leased by the W&OD in 1968, B&O #8413 was one of the last locomotives to operate on the W&OD before the railroad closed during the same year. After four transfers of ownership, Cargill purchased the locomotive, which became Cargill #6751. Cargill moved the locomotive to Ogden, Utah, in 1993 for use in the company's Globe Mill. Following Cargill's donation of the locomotive in 2010, the Utah Central Railway and the Union Pacific Railroad delivered it to the Utah State Railroad Museum at Ogden's Union Station on May 21, 2011, where it was photographed in 2020. 
C&O 5015 is an American Locomotive Company (ALCO) S-2 diesel–electric switcher locomotive that the W&OD leased from the C&O. Built in 1946 with a 1000-horsepower engine, the locomotive was used during the W&OD's final decade of operations. After serving five more railroads, the locomotive became Columbia & Reading Railway #2-26 in 2009. It was operating in Columbia, Pennsylvania, on that line as CORY 2-26 in 2020.
W&OD 47, a General Electric (GE) 44-ton centercab switcher, built and delivered to the W&OD in December 1941 with construction number 15041 and a 380-horsepower engine, was the railroad's first diesel–electric locomotive. It was joined by the similar #48 and #49, both built in August 1942. Sold to the Fonda, Johnstown & Gloversville Railroad in 1950 and renumbered to 30, the former W&OD 47 went to Cargill in Houston, Texas in 1967. Cargill subsequently reassigned it to Denver, Colorado. After serving on the Great Western Railway of Colorado as #44, the locomotive retained its number when it became the Burlington Junction Railway's (BJRY's) first when the BJRY opened in 1985. BJRY44 subsequently operated in Mount Pleasant, West Burlington and Burlington, Iowa. The locomotive was photographed in Burlington during 2018.

W&OD 50 is a 50-ton steeplecab Baldwin-Westinghouse electric locomotive built in October 1920 with four Westinghouse type 562-D-5 100 horsepower motors as Baldwin Locomotive Works (BLW) serial number 53784 and brought to the W&OD Railway during the same year. After retiring the locomotive in 1945, the W&OD Railroad sold it in 1947 to the Cedar Rapids & Iowa City Railway, which renumbered it to 58. In 1955 it was sold to the Kansas City, Kaw Valley & Western Railway as #507. It was sold in 1962 to the Iowa Terminal Railroad and renumbered to 53, later becoming #50 of the Iowa Traction Railroad in 1987. Upon purchase in October 2012, the line was renamed to the Iowa Traction Railway. The Iowa Traction Railway was operating the locomotive in Mason City, Iowa, in 2021, the locomotive's 101st year.

See also 
 Great Falls and Old Dominion Railroad
 Northern Virginia trolleys

Notes

References 
 

pp. 1–18.
pp. 19–144.
In Appendix K of Northern Virginia Regional Park Authority - Pre-filed Direct Testimony of Mr. Hafner, Mr. Mcray and Mr. Simmons, November 30, 2005 (Parts 4 and 5), Case No. PUE-2005-00018, Virginia State Corporation Commission. Obtained in  Archived September 28, 2017.

King, W.E. (1934-07-19). Index map showing Washington & Old Dominion Railway's line abandoned in relation to other railroads and common carriers in lower left corner of 

 (A detailed history of the Washington and Old Dominion Railroad.)

Further reading

External links 

 Photographs of stations, tickets and promotional materials about the Great Falls and Old Dominion Railroad and the Great Falls Division of the Washington & Old Dominion Railway.
  Website describing the history of the W&OD Railroad.

American companies established in 1936
Defunct Virginia railroads
Predecessors of the Chesapeake and Ohio Railway
Railway companies established in 1936
Railway companies disestablished in 1968
Transportation in Arlington County, Virginia
Transportation in Fairfax County, Virginia
Transportation in Loudoun County, Virginia